The University of Hawaiʻi System, formally the University of Hawaiʻi and popularly known as UH, is a public college and university system that confers associate, bachelor's, master's, and doctoral degrees through three universities, seven community colleges, an employment training center, three university centers, four education centers and various other research facilities distributed across six islands throughout the state of Hawaii in the United States. All schools of the University of Hawaiʻi system are accredited by the Western Association of Schools and Colleges. The UH system's main administrative offices are located on the property of the University of Hawaiʻi at Mānoa in Honolulu CDP.

History
The present-day University of Hawai'i System was created in 1965 which combined the State of Hawai'i's technical and community colleges under one system within the former University of Hawaiʻi.

Former University of Hawai'i

The University of Hawai'i was created by the Territory of Hawaiʻi in 1907 as a land-grant college of agriculture and mechanical arts and held its first classes in 1907. In 1912 it moved to its present location in Mānoa Valley and being renamed College of Hawaii. In 1919 the College of Hawaiʻi obtained university status by the Hawaiʻi Territorial Legislature and was renamed the University of Hawaiʻi.

In 1965, the state legislature created a system of community colleges and placed it within the university. The university was renamed the University of Hawaiʻi at Mānoa to distinguish it from other campuses in the University of Hawaiʻi System in 1972.

Colleges and universities
The University of Hawaiʻi at Mānoa is the flagship institution of the University of Hawaiʻi system. It was founded as a land-grant college under the terms of the Morrill Acts of 1862 and 1890. Programs include Hawaiian/Pacific Studies, Astronomy, East Asian Languages and Literature, Asian Studies, Comparative Philosophy, Marine Science, Second Language Studies, along with Botany, Engineering, Ethnomusicology, Geophysics, Law, Business, Linguistics, Mathematics, and Medicine.

The second-largest institution is the University of Hawaiʻi at Hilo on the "Big Island" of Hawaiʻi, with over 3,000 students. The University of Hawaiʻi – West Oʻahu in Kapolei primarily serves students who reside in Honolulu's western and central suburban communities.

The University of Hawaiʻi Community College System comprises four community colleges island campuses on O'ahu and one each on Maui, Kauaʻi, and Hawaii. The colleges were created to improve accessibility of courses to more Hawaiʻi residents and provide an affordable means of easing the transition from secondary school/high school to college for many students. University of Hawaiʻi education centers are located in more remote areas of the State and its several islands, supporting rural communities via distance education.

Universities
University of Hawaiʻi at Mānoa
University of Hawaiʻi at Hilo
University of Hawaiʻi – West Oʻahu

Colleges
University of Hawaiʻi Maui College

Community colleges
Hawaiʻi Community College in Hilo
Hawaiʻi Community College in Kailua Kona
Honolulu Community College
Kapiʻolani Community College
Kauaʻi Community College
Leeward Community College
Windward Community College

Professional schools
Daniel K. Inouye College of Pharmacy
School of Ocean and Earth Science and Technology
John A. Burns School of Medicine
William S. Richardson School of Law
Shidler College of Business

Research facilities
Center for Philippine Studies
Cancer Research Center of Hawaiʻi
East-West Center
Haleakalā Observatory
Hawaiʻi Natural Energy Institute
Institute for Astronomy
Institute of Geophysics and Planetology
Institute of Marine Biology
Lyon Arboretum
Mauna Kea Observatory
W. M. Keck Observatory
Waikīkī Aquarium

University centers
University of Hawaiʻi Center West Hawaiʻi
University of Hawaiʻi Center Kauaʻi
University of Hawaiʻi Center Maui

Education centers
Molokaʻi Education Center
Lānaʻi Education Center
Hāna Education Center
Waiʻanae Education Center
Lāhainā Education Center

Board of Regents
In accordance with Article X, Section 6 of the Hawaiʻi State Constitution, the University of Hawaiʻi is governed by a Board of Regents, composed of 15 unpaid members who are nominated by a Regents Candidate Advisory Council, appointed by the governor, and confirmed by the state legislature. The board oversees all aspects of governance for the university system, including its internal structure and management. The board also appoints, evaluates, and if necessary removes the president of the University of Hawaiʻi.

Student regents
The university's governing board includes a current student appointed by the governor of Hawaiʻi to serve a two-year term as a full voting regent. The practice of appointing a student to the board was approved by the Hawaiʻi State Legislature in 1997.

Notable alumni

Alumni of the University of Hawaiʻi system include many notable persons in various walks of life. Senator Daniel Inouye and Tammy Duckworth both are veterans of the US military who were injured in the line of duty then later entered government service. Bette Midler and Georgia Engel are successful entertainers on the national stage. Composer Hsiung-Zee Wong also attended the University of Hawai'i. President Barack Obama's parents, Barack Obama Sr. and Ann Dunham, and half-sister, Maya Soetoro-Ng, also earned degrees from the Mānoa campus, where his parents met in a Russian language class.  His mother earned three degrees from the University of Hawaiʻi including a PhD in anthropology.

Mazie Hirono is a current U.S. senator. She graduated from the University of Hawaii with a BA in psychology. She is the first elected female senator from Hawaii, the first Asian-American woman elected to the Senate, the first U.S. senator born in Japan, and the nation's first Buddhist senator.

Alice Augusta Ball was not only the first woman to graduate from the College of Hawaiʻi (now the University of Hawaiʻi) in 1915, but was also the first African American research chemist and instructor in the college's chemistry department. In addition, she was the first person to successfully develop a water-soluble form of chaulmoogra oil that was used for decades to relieve the symptoms of Hansen's disease (leprosy).

Notable faculty

The University of Hawaiʻi system has had many faculty members of note.  Many were visiting faculty or came after they won major awards like Nobel Laureate Georg von Békésy. Ryuzo Yanagimachi, principal investigator of the research group that developed a method of cloning from adult animal cells, is still on the faculty.

In July 2019, Bob Huey, a professor of Japanese literature in the Department of East Asian Languages and Literatures, was presented the Order of the Rising Sun, Gold Rays with Neck Ribbon, one of Japan's highest honors for those without Japanese citizenship.

Further reading

References

External links

University of Hawaiʻi Athletics

 
American Association of State Colleges and Universities
Buildings and structures in Honolulu
Education in Honolulu
Public universities and colleges in Hawaii
Schools accredited by the Western Association of Schools and Colleges
1907 establishments in Hawaii
Public university systems in the United States